Namurachi is a rural community located in Urique Municipality, Chihuahua, Mexico. It had a population of 4 inhabitants at the 2010 census, and is situated at an elevation of 2,022 meters above sea level.

References

Populated places in Chihuahua (state)